Geltinger Bucht is an Amt ("collective municipality") in the district of Schleswig-Flensburg, in Schleswig-Holstein, Germany. Its seat is in Steinbergkirche. It was formed on 1 January 2008 from the former Ämter Gelting and Steinbergkirche.

The Amt Geltinger Bucht consists of the following municipalities:

References

Ämter in Schleswig-Holstein